Rashid Alhassan (born 2 September 1998) is a Ghanaian professional footballer who plays as defender for Ghana Premier League side Medeama S.C. He previously played for Wa All Stars.

Club career

Wa All Stars 
Alhassan started his career with Wa All Stars, now Legon Cities FC. He was a member of the Wa All Stars squad that won the 2016 Ghana Premier League under the tutelage of former coach Enos Kwame Adepah.

Elman FC 
On 18 January 2019, Alhassan along with fellow Wa All Stars compatriot Razak Toufic were unveiled by Somali Premier League side Elman SC after signing contracts with the club. The duo were reunited with former Wa All Stars coach Abubakari Mumuni Sokpari ahead of the   2019 Somali First Division season. Rashid later moved on loan to Mogadishu City Club in July 2019, prior to the start of the 2019–20 CAF Confederation Cup campaign. He later returned Elman FC before his contract expired in September 2019.

In September 2019, he was reportedly linked with Ghana Premier League side Karela United after the expiration of his contract.

Medeama SC 
In November 2019, ahead of the 2019–20 Ghana Premier League season Alhassan signed for Medeama SC on a free transfer. He signed a 3-year deal with the club. On 29 December 2020, he was an used substitute in the first of the match of the season against Ebusua Dwarfs which ended in a 3–1 victory for Medeama. He made his debut on 16 February 2020, playing the full 90 minutes in a 2–1 loss to Elmina Sharks. He went on and made 6 league appearances before the league was put on hold and latter cancelled as a result of the COVID-19 pandemic.

Personal life 
On 5 February 2021, Alhassan lost his mother after an illness.

Honours

Club 
Wa All Stars

 Ghana Premier League: 2016

References

External links 
 

Living people
1998 births
Association football defenders
Ghanaian footballers
Legon Cities FC players
Ghana Premier League players
Elman FC players
Ghanaian expatriate sportspeople in Somalia
Medeama SC players
Ghanaian expatriate footballers
Expatriate footballers in Somalia